Walter Crane (15 August 184514 March 1915) was an English artist and book illustrator. He is considered to be the most influential, and among the most prolific, children's book creators of his generation and, along with Randolph Caldecott and Kate Greenaway, one of the strongest contributors to the child's nursery motif that the genre of English children's illustrated literature would exhibit in its developmental stages in the later 19th century.

Crane's work featured some of the more colourful and detailed beginnings of the child-in-the-garden motifs that would characterize many nursery rhymes and children's stories for decades to come. He was part of the Arts and Crafts movement and produced an array of paintings, illustrations, children's books, ceramic tiles, wallpapers and other decorative arts. Crane is also remembered for his creation of a number of iconic images associated with the international socialist movement.

Biography

Early life and influences 

Crane was the second son of Thomas Crane, a portrait painter and miniaturist, and Marie Crane (née Kearsley), the daughter of a prosperous malt-maker. His elder brother Thomas would also go into illustration, and sister Lucy was a noted writer. He was a fluent follower of the newer art movements and he came to study and appreciate the detailed senses of the Pre-Raphaelite Brotherhood, and was also a diligent student of the renowned artist and critic John Ruskin. A set of coloured page designs to illustrate Tennyson's "Lady of Shalott" gained the approval of wood-engraver William James Linton to whom Walter Crane was apprenticed for three years in 1859–62. As a wood-engraver he had abundant opportunity for the minute study of the contemporary artists whose work passed through his hands, of Pre-Raphaelites Dante Gabriel Rossetti and John Everett Millais, as well as Sir John Tenniel, the illustrator of Alice in Wonderland, and Frederick Sandys. He was a student who admired the masters of the Italian Renaissance, however he was more influenced by the Elgin marbles in the British Museum. A further and important element in the development of his talent was the study of Japanese colour-prints, the methods of which he imitated in a series of toy books, which started a new fashion.

Political activity 

From the early 1880s, initially under William Morris's influence, Crane was closely associated with the socialist movement. He did as much as Morris himself to bring art into the daily life of all classes. With this object in view he devoted much attention to designs for textiles and wallpapers, and to house decoration; but he also used his art for the direct advancement of the Socialist cause. For a long time he provided the weekly cartoons for the socialist organs Justice, Commonweal and The Clarion. Many of these were collected as Cartoons for the Cause. He devoted much time and energy to the work of the Art Workers Guild, of which he was master in 1888 and 1889 and to the Arts and Crafts Exhibition Society, which he helped to found in 1888.  He was also a Vice President of the Healthy and Artistic Dress Union, a movement begun in 1890, whose aim was to promote loose-fitting clothing, in opposition to "stiffness, tightness and weight".  They produced numerous pamphlets setting out their cause, including one entitled "How to Dress Without a Corset" which Crane illustrated.

Although not himself an anarchist, Crane contributed to several libertarian publishers, including Liberty Press and Freedom Press. He is credited with the design and decoration of the front façade of "The Bomb Shop", Henderson's bookshop at 66 Charing Cross Road specialising in left-wing and radical literature.

Crane was controversial in his support of the four Chicago anarchists executed in 1887 in connection with the Haymarket affair. Visiting the United States for the first time in connection with an exhibition of his work in 1891, Crane scandalised polite society by appearing at a Boston anarchist meeting and expressing the opinion that the Haymarket defendants had been put to death wrongfully. Returning to his hotel, Crane found a letter stating that he faced "hopeless ruin" among American patrons of the arts owing to his support of those who were commonly considered to be terrorist conspirators in public opinion of the day. Financial support was withdrawn and planned dinners in Crane's honour were cancelled. In response to the controversy, Crane wrote a letter to the press explaining that he had not meant to cause insult and did not himself favour the use of explosives, but had merely been expressing his principled opinion that those convicted were innocent of the crime for which they were charged. The incident was memorialised in the press as "probably the most dramatic episode" in the artist's career.

Death and legacy 

Walter Crane died on 14 March 1915 in Horsham Hospital, West Sussex. His body was cremated at the Golders Green Crematorium, where his ashes remain.  He was survived by three children, Beatrice, Lionel and Lancelot.

Artistic work

Paintings and illustrations 

In 1862, his picture The Lady of Shalott was exhibited at the Royal Academy, but the Academy steadily refused his maturer work and after the opening of the Grosvenor Gallery in 1877, he ceased to send pictures to Burlington House. In 1863 the printer Edmund Evans employed Crane to illustrate yellowbacks, and in 1865 they began to collaborate on toy books of nursery rhymes and fairy tales. From 1865 to 1876 Crane and Evans produced two to three toy books each year.

These are a few of his illustration suites: In 1864 he began to illustrate a series of sixpenny toy books of nursery rhymes in three colours for Edmund Evans. He was allowed more freedom in a series beginning with The Frog Prince (1874) which showed markedly the influence of Japanese art, and of a long visit to Italy following on his marriage in 1871. His work was characterized by sharp outlines and flat tints. The Baby's Opera was a book of English nursery songs available in 1877 with Evans, and a third series of children's books with the collective title Romance of the Three R's provided a regular course of instruction in art for the nursery. In his early "Lady of Shalott", the artist had shown his preoccupation with unity of design in book illustration by printing in the words of the poem himself, in the view that this union of the calligrapher's and the decorator's art was one secret of the beauty of the old illuminated books.

He followed the same course in The First of May: A Fairy Masque by his friend John Wise, text and decoration being in this case reproduced by photogravure. The Goose Girl illustration taken from his beautiful Household Stories from Grimm (1882) was done again as a big watercolour and then reproduced in tapestry by William Morris. Flora's Feast, A Masque of Flowers had lithographic reproductions of Crane's line drawings washed in with watercolour; he also decorated in colour The Wonder Book of Nathaniel Hawthorne, and Margaret Deland's Old Garden.  During the eighties and nineties he illustrated 16 children's novels by Mrs. Molesworth in black and white. In 1894 he collaborated with William Morris in the page decoration of The Story of the Glittering Plain, published at the Kelmscott Press, which was executed in the style of 16th-century Italian and German woodcuts. Crane illustrated editions of Edmund Spenser's Faerie Queene (19 pts., 1894–1896) and The Shepheard's Calendar, as well as Ali Baba and the Forty Thieves (1873), The Happy Prince and Other Stories by Oscar Wilde (1888), an edition of Arthurian Legends, A Flower Wedding. and in 1900 Judge Parry's re-narration of Cervantes' Don Quixote of the Mancha.

Crane also illustrated Nellie Dale's books On Teaching English Reading, Steps to Reading, First Primer, Second Primer, Infant Reader, Book I, and Book II. These were most probably completed between 1898 and 1907.

Poetry
Crane wrote and illustrated three books of poetry,  Queen Summer (1891), Renascence (1891), and The Sirens Three (1886).

Stained glass
Crane's earliest stained glass window designs were some American commissions with glass made by William Morris. He then had a British commission - the windows for the new Agapemonite church of the Ark of the Covenant in London. These designs are  a mixture of Art Nouveau floral works on the side windows and depictions of sin, shame and the translations of Enoch and Elijah. They were completed by Sylvester Sparrow and have been described by English Heritage as Crane's "most significant work in this medium", and in the justification for listing the church as Grade II* "the stained glass is extraordinary and has more than special interest in the context of Arts and Crafts stained glass".

Mature work 
His own easel pictures, chiefly allegorical in subject, among them The Bridge of Life (1884) and The Mower (1891), were exhibited regularly at the Grosvenor Gallery and later at the New Gallery. Neptune's Horses was exhibited at the New Gallery in 1893, and with it may be classed his Rainbow and the Wave.

His varied work includes examples of plaster relief, tiles, stained glass, pottery, wallpaper, and textile designs, in all of which he applied the principle that in purely decorative design "the artist works freest and best without direct reference to nature, and should have learned the forms he makes use of by heart". An exhibition of his work of different kinds was held at the Fine Art Society's galleries in Bond Street in 1891, and taken to the United States in the same year by the artist himself. It was afterwards exhibited in Germany, Austria and Scandinavia.

Crane was elected a member of the Institute of Painters in Water Colours in 1882, resigning in 1886; two years later he became an associate of the Water Colour Society (1888); he was an examiner for the Science and Art Department at the South Kensington Museum; director of design at the Manchester Municipal School (1894); art director of Reading College (1896); and in 1898 for a short time principal of the Royal College of Art, where he planned a new curriculum intended to bring students into closer contact with tools and materials. His lectures at Manchester were published with illustrated drawings as The Bases of Design (1898) and Line and Form (1900). The Decorative Illustration of Books, Old and New (2nd ed., London and New York, 1900) is a further contribution to theory. A well-known portrait of Crane by George Frederick Watts was exhibited at the New Gallery in 1893.

In 1887, Crane was commissioned by Emilie Barrington to paint a series of murals to decorate the newly constructed Red Cross Hall in Southwark, a project conceived by the housing campaigner Octavia Hill. Crane produced designs for nine panels, which were displayed at the 1890 Arts and Crafts Exhibition Society show. Ultimately, only three designs were converted into full-size murals, these being: Alice Ayres (1890), depicting the heroine of the Union Street fire which had occurred in 1885 just a few streets away; Jamieson (1892), depicting two Scottish railway workers, Alex Jamieson and his nephew Alexander, who lost their lives in 1874 while working on the Glasgow and Paisley line; and  Rescue from a Well (1894), depicting George Eales, a 58-year-old labourer who in December 1887 at Drummer, near Basingstoke in Hampshire, descended into a well to rescue a five-year-old child. After 1894, no further murals were created, partly due to shortages in funding and other commitments, but also because it was discovered that the gas lighting in the hall was damaging the paintings. The Red Cross Hall is now in private hands and the status of the murals is unknown.

A large mosaic, The Sphere and Message of Art, designed by Crane, was intended for the façade of the Whitechapel Art Gallery at the time of its construction in 1898. Sadly, sufficient funds were not forthcoming, resulting instead in a frontage clad in buff terracotta tiles. (The drawing still exists.)

Crane was much admired in Hungary and in 1900 Jenő Radisics, the director of the Budapest Museum of Applied Arts, organised a retrospective of his work there. Crane visited the city in the autumn, was feted, gave lectures and visited Transylvania. He went to Kolozsvár (now Cluj-Napoca), Bánffyhunyad (now Huedin), and Kalotaszeg (now Țara Călatei) in search of Hungarian traditional art. He recorded the visit in Ideals in Art. Zsuzsa Gonda in her review of Crane’s visit says that it is one of the most extensively documented events in the artistic life of the country in that period. The welcome extended to him was not entirely personal, however: he was the representative of England, the nation that sheltered Kossuth and took him to its heart.

One of Crane's last major works was his lunettes at the Royal West of England Academy, which were painted in 1913.

Gallery

Works 
 Cartoons for the Cause 1886–1896 London: Twentieth Century Press, 1896 (revised version 1907). 
 Line and Form. London: G. Bell and Sons, 1900.
 Moot points; friendly disputes on art & industry between Walter Crane & Lewis F. Day. London, B.T. Batsford, 1903
An Artist's Reminiscences. New York: Macmillan, 1907.
 William Morris to Whistler. London: G.Bell and Sons, 1911

See also 

Royal West of England Academy

Footnotes

Further reading 
 Stefan Arvidsson, Socialist Style and Mythology. Socialist Idealism 1871-1914. Routledge, 2017.
 Helen Stalker, From Toy Books to Bloody Sunday: Tales from the Walter Crane Archive. Whitworth Art Gallery, 2009.
 Morna O'Neill, 'Art and Labour's Cause Is One': Walter Crane and Manchester, 1880–1915. Whitworth Art Gallery, 2008.
 Morna O'Neill, Walter Crane: The Arts and Crafts, Painting, and Politics, 1875-1890. New Haven, CT: Yale University Press, 2010.
 John Price, Everyday Heroism: Victorian Constructions of the Heroic Civilian. Bloomsbury, 2014.

External links 

 Catharine T. Patterson Collection of Walter Crane. General Collection, Beinecke Rare Book and Manuscript Library, Yale University.
 Walter Crane Collection. General Collection, Beinecke Rare Book and Manuscript Library, Yale University.
 Walter Crane (1845–1915), Indiana University
 
 
 
 Works by Walter Crane at Toronto Public Library
 
 Works at Open Library
 Walter Crane Of the Decorative Illustration of Books Old and New on Project Gutenberg
 
 
 Pierre Bonnard, the Graphic Art, an exhibition catalog from The Metropolitan Museum of Art (fully available online as PDF), which contains material on Crane (see index)
 Baby's Own Aesop From the Collections at the Library of Congress

1845 births
1915 deaths
English illustrators
English children's book illustrators
Arts and Crafts movement artists
English socialists
People associated with the Royal College of Art
Socialist League (UK, 1885) members
Artists from Liverpool
English watercolourists
People associated with the Museum of New Zealand Te Papa Tongarewa
Golders Green Crematorium
19th-century English painters
English male painters
20th-century English painters
Members of the Royal Institute of Painters in Water Colours
Masters of the Art Worker's Guild
20th-century English male artists
19th-century English male artists